The 2006–07 Czech Extraliga season was the 14th season of the Czech Extraliga since its creation after the breakup of Czechoslovakia and the Czechoslovak First Ice Hockey League in 1993.

Standings

Playoffs

Pre-Playoffs

HC Energie Karlovy Vary (7) - (10) HC Oceláři Třinec 0:3

HC Rabat Kladno (8) - (9) HC Znojemští Orli 0:3

Quarterfinals
HC Sparta Praha - HC Hame Zlin 4:1
Bili Tygri Liberec - HC Ocleari Trinec 4:3
HC Moeller Pardubice - HC Znojemsti Orli 4:3
HC Ceske Budejovice - HC Slavia Praha 4:2

Semifinals
HC Sparta Praha - Bili Tygri Liberec 4:1
HC Moeller Pardubice - HC Ceske Budejovice 4-1

Final
HC Sparta Praha - HC Moeller Pardubice 4:2

Relegation
No promotion/relegation between the Czech Extraliga and Czech 1. Liga existed this year.

References

External links 
 

2006-07
Czech
1